Maikel Scheffers and Ronald Vink defeated Nicolas Peifer and Jon Rydberg in the final, 6–0, 6–0 to win the men's doubles wheelchair tennis title at the 2010 US Open.

Stéphane Houdet and Stefan Olsson were the defending champions, but were defeated by Scheffers and Vink in the semifinals.

Seeds
 Robin Ammerlaan /  Shingo Kunieda (first round, withdrew)
 Stéphane Houdet /  Stefan Olsson (first round)

Doubles

Finals

External links
Main Draw

Wheelchair Men's Doubles
U.S. Open, 2010 Men's Doubles